Ryton is a hamlet and former civil parish  from York, now in the parish of Habton, in the Ryedale district, in the county of North Yorkshire, England. In 1961 the parish had a population of 124.

History 
The name "Ryton" means 'Farm/settlement on the River Rye'. Ryton was recorded in the Domesday Book as Ritone. Ryton was called Ritun and Ritone in 11th century, Rihtuna and Rictona in the 12th century and Richton in the 13th century. Ryton was formerly a township in the parish of Kirby Misperton, from 1866 Ryton was a civil parish in its own right, on 1 April 1986 the parish was abolished and merged with Great Habton and Little Habton to form Habton. "Riton" is a name recorded in historical writing.

References

External links 

Hamlets in North Yorkshire
Former civil parishes in North Yorkshire
Ryedale